Antoni Wereszczyński (17 December 1890 – 4 September 1953) was a Colonel in the Polish Army.

Biography

Career
In 1923, he served in the 22nd Field Artillery Regiment in Rzeszów, Poland, and in 1924 in the branch office in charge of the School for non-commissioned officers, while remaining an officer, serving in 22nd Regiment Light Artillery. Four years later, he commanded the 1st Light Artillery Regiment of the legions in Vilnius. In 1932 he served as Chief Officer in 1st Group of artillery Headquarters in Warsaw. In June 1934 he was appointed commander of the 14th Light Artillery Regiment in Poznań.

In August 1939, he commanded the 25th Regiment of Light Artillery in Kalisz, then became Commander of the 25th Artillery Infantry Division.

Death
In September 1939 he fought at "Bzura" and the Siege of Warsaw. He was captured when Warsaw fell to the Germans, and was imprisoned in the German prison camp "Oflag in Marburg". Released in 1945, he returned to Poland and the Polish Army, where he served as Artillery Officer in Bydgoszcz in Pomeranian Military District. He died on 4 September 1953 at hands of the communist Intelligence Service during a brutal interrogation in the Main Directorate of Information of the Polish Army in Warsaw. There is a symbolic tomb located in the Powązki Military Cemetery in Warsaw. His remains are interred in Bydgoszcz.

Ranks
 Captain – revised 3 May 1922 active from 1 June 1919
 Major – 18 February 1928 active from 1 January 1928
 Lieutenant Colonel
 Colonel

Decorations
 Silver Cross of War Virtuti Militari
 Cross of Independence
 Cross of Valor
 Golden cross of merit
 Medal Międzysojuszniczy "Medaille Interalliee"

References

Further reading
 Roczniki oficerskie z 1923, 1924, 1928 i 1932
 Ludwik Głowacki, Obrona Warszawy i Modlina na tle kampanii wrześniowej 1939, Wydawnictwo Ministerstwa Obrony Narodowej, Warszawa 1985, wyd. V, 
 Tadeusz Pióro, Armia ze skazą. W Wojsku Polskim 1945–1968 (wspomnienia i refleksje), "Czytelnik", Warszawa 1994, wyd. I
 Igor Błagowieszczański, Artyleria Wojska Polskiego w latach 1918–1939, Wojskowy Przegląd Historyczny Nr 4 (71), Warszawa 1974
 Piotr Bauer i Bogusław Polak, Armia "Poznań" w wojnie obronnej 1939, Wydawnictwo Poznańskie, Poznań 1983, 

1890 births
1953 deaths
Burials at Powązki Military Cemetery
Polish Army officers
Prisoners who died in Polish People's Republic detention